Asha Nautiyal (born 25 June 1969) is an Indian politician. She was a MLA from Kedarnath constituency in the year 2002 and 2007 as a member of the Bharatiya Janata Party.

Political life
 1997–1998 : BJP Vice-president Rudraprayag.
 1999 : BJP Mahila Morcha President of Rudraprayag District.
 2002 : MLA from Kedarnath.
 2007 : MLA from Kedarnath.
 2009–2012 : Parliamentary Secretary.

References

Bharatiya Janata Party politicians from Uttarakhand
Uttarakhand MLAs 2002–2007
Uttarakhand MLAs 2007–2012
People from Rudraprayag district
1969 births
Living people
Women members of the Uttarakhand Legislative Assembly
21st-century Indian women politicians
21st-century Indian politicians